, is the 26th in Nippon Animation's World Masterpiece Theater anime. The series is an adaptation of Canadian children's literature author Budge Wilson's 2008 prequel novel Before Green Gables, which was translated into Japanese as Konnichiwa Anne (こんにちは アン) by Akiko Usagawa. It chronicles the early years of main character Anne Shirley as she loses both her parents and is adopted by Matthew and Marilla Cuthbert.

Production and development

Introduced in Lucy Maud Montgomery's 1908 novel Anne of Green Gables, the series marks the 100th anniversary of the original novel's release and the 30th anniversary of its highly popular anime adaptation, Akage no Anne, also produced by Nippon Animation and one of the first pioneering World Masterpiece Theater series. The series is narrated by Eiko Hisamura, who portrayed Anne in the original Akage no Anne.

While developing the series, Nippon Animation's staff undertook research by visiting a historical village in southeastern Canada which formed the inspiration for Avonlea in the novel, going to historical houses preserved from the era in which the novel is set and taking photographs, with core staff members and character designer and chief animation director Takayo Nishimura (previously chief animation director and character designer for 5 Centimeters Per Second), basing the characters, props and settings on them and also from historical books that he bought there. Nippon Animation's staff have followed this format of contextual research while producing other World Masterpiece Theater series.

The series premiered on April 5, 2009, and aired every Sunday from 19:30 to 20:00 JST on Fuji Television's broadcasting satellite network BS-Fuji. From May 2009, it was also aired on SKY PerfecTV!'s network Animax. Online streaming on Biglobe was announced, but was eventually suspended.

Staff
Director: Katsuyoshi Yatabe
Series composition and screenplay: Michiru Shimada
Original character design: Yoshiharu Satō
Character designs and chief animation director: Takayo Nishimura
Music: Yasuharu Takanashi, Hiromi Mizutani, Kenji Fujisawa
Art director: Shigeru Morimoto
Colour design: Tomoko Komatsubara
Production: Nippon Animation

Characters 

 Anne Shirley
 

 Joanna (Harrigan) Thomas
 
 Anne's maternal aunt, wife to Bert and mother to Eliza, Horace, Edward, Harry and Noah. She is constantly trying the make ends meet, and as such is often in a bad mood.

 Bert Thomas
 
 Joanna's husband and father to her children.  Due to his laziness and alcoholism, he is unable to hold down a job, usually spending whatever money he earns from the oddjobs he does on cheap liquor.

 Eliza Thomas
 
 First born daughter of Thomas family and primary income of the household. She cares for Anne like her own child, but later marries Roger Emerson and leaves Anne behind.

 Horace Thomas
 
 First son of the Thomas family

 Edward Thomas
 
 Second son of the Thomas family

 Harry Thomas
 
 Third son of the Thomas family

 Noah Thomas

 Fourth son of the Thomas family

 Jessie (MacIntyre) Gleeson
 
 An old widower with high standing

 Lochinvar
 Anne's companion cat. His name is taken from a line of the poem "Marmion" by Walter Scott.

 Narration

References

External links
anime television series official website
Nippon Animation's official announcement
 
 Before Green Gables to Debut in Canadian Embassy in Japan (Anime News Network)

2009 anime television series debuts
2009 Japanese television series endings
Animated television series about orphans
Anne of Green Gables television series
Drama anime and manga
Historical anime and manga
Japanese children's animated adventure television series
Nippon Animation
Prequel television series
Slice of life anime and manga
Television shows set in Canada
World Masterpiece Theater series